The Moose Jaw Warriors are a major junior ice hockey team in the Western Hockey League based in Moose Jaw, Saskatchewan. The Warriors play in the East Division of the Eastern Conference. The team plays its home games at Moose Jaw Events Centre.

History

The franchise was established as the Winnipeg Warriors, prior to the start of the 1980-81 season and played out of Winnipeg Arena, where they shared with the Winnipeg Jets.

The Warriors played in the Moose Jaw Civic Centre also known as "The Crushed Can" for 26 seasons, before moving to Mosaic Place, now renamed Moose Jaw Events Centre, in the city centre.

The first few seasons in Moose Jaw saw the emergence of Theoren Fleury as the team's primary offensive threat. Despite having a mediocre on-ice product, Fleury finished among the top five scorers in the WHL during his tenure with the team. Led by Fleury, Kelly Buchberger, Mike Keane and Lyle Odelein, the Warriors made the franchise's first playoff appearance after the relocation during the 1985-86 WHL season.

The team has never won the WHL championship. The franchise made their first appearance in the WHL Finals in the 2005–06 season, getting swept by the Vancouver Giants in four straight games.

Championships
In 2006, the team went on a successful playoff run eliminating the Brandon Wheat Kings, Calgary Hitmen and Medicine Hat Tigers, before being swept in four games by the Vancouver Giants in the WHL Finals.

Division titles won: 4 – 2003–04, 05–06, 11–12, 17–18
Regular season titles won: 1 – 17–18
League championships: Finalists in 2006
Memorial Cup titles: None

Season-by-season record
Note: GP = Games played, W = Wins, L = Losses, T = Ties OTL = Overtime losses Pts = Points, GF = Goals for, GA = Goals against

Current roster
Updated February 11, 2023.

  
  
 

 
 
 

 

 

  

   

  

 

 

|}

Team records

NHL alumni
List of Moose Jaw Warriors alumni to have played in the National Hockey League (NHL).

Chris Armstrong
Blair Atcheynum
Scott Bailey
Lonny Bohonos
Johnny Boychuk
Dustin Boyd
Mike Brodeur
Kyle Brodziak
Troy Brouwer
Curtis Brown
Kelly Buchberger
Frederic Chabot
Joel Edmundson
Deryk Engelland
Tomas Fleischmann
Theoren Fleury
Owen Fussey
Travis Hamonic
Matt Higgins
Quinton Howden
Blair Jones
Mike Keane
Sheldon Kennedy
Paul Kruse
Pavel Kubina
Dale Kushner
Brooks Laich
Darryl Laplante
Reed Low
Jamie Lundmark
Masi Marjamaki
Jim McKenzie
Tomas Mojzis
Lyle Odelein
Nathan Paetsch
Brayden Point
Dale Purinton
Morgan Rielly
Aaron Rome
Kevin Smyth
Ryan Smyth
Martin Spanhel
Rastislav Stana
Ryan Stanton
Brian Sutherby
Dave Thomlinson
Ryan Tobler
Roman Vopat
Jason Widmer

NLL alumni
List of Moose Jaw Warriors alumni to have played in the National Lacrosse League (NLL):

Kaleb Toth

Retired numbers
  9 Theoren Fleury
 24 Kelly Buchberger
 25 Mike Keane
 28 Ryan Smyth

See also
 List of ice hockey teams in Saskatchewan
 CILG – broadcsts the Moose Jaw Warriors hockey games

References

External links
Moose Jaw Warriors website

Ice hockey teams in Saskatchewan
Ice hockey clubs established in 1980
Western Hockey League teams
Sport in Moose Jaw